The 1923 National Championship (Serbo-Croato-Slovenian: Državno prvenstvo 1923. / Државно првенство 1923.) held in the Kingdom of Serbs, Croats and Slovenes was the first nationwide domestic football competition. At this point there was no league championship in the modern sense as the competition was held in a single-legged cup format, with participating clubs qualifying via regional playoffs organised by the existing 6 regional football subfederations.

Qualified clubs

JSD Bačka (Subotica Football Subassociation)
Građanski Zagreb (Zagreb Football Subassociation)
Hajduk Split (Split Football Subassociation)
Ilirija Ljubljana (Ljubljana Football Subassociation)
SK Jugoslavija Belgrade (Belgrade Football Subassociation)
SAŠK Sarajevo (Sarajevo Football Subassociation)

Tournament

Quarter finals

|-
|colspan="3" style="background-color:#D0D0D0" align=center|2 September 1923

|}

Semi finals

|-
|colspan="3" style="background-color:#D0D0D0" align=center|23 September 1923

|}

Final

|-
|colspan="5" style="background-color:#D0D0D0" align=center|30 September/1 October 1923

|}

Winning squad
Champions:

HŠK Građanski (coach: Arthur Gaskell)

Dragutin Vrđuka
Fritz Ferderber
Miho Remec
Jaroslav Schiffer
Dragutin Vragović
Rudolf Rupec
Rudolf Hitrec
Dragutin Babić
Stjepan Pasinek
Antun Pavleković
Franjo Mantler
Emil Perška
Bela Šefer
Stebl
Gec

Top scorers
Final goalscoring position, number of goals, player/players and club.
1 - 4 goals - Dragan Jovanović (Jugoslavija)
2 - 3 goals - Jakupec (SAŠK)
3 - 2 goals - Franz Mantler, Dragutin Babić, Emil Perška (all Građanski Zagreb), Nedžad Sulejmanpašić and Dragutin Sieber (SAŠK)

See also
Yugoslav Cup
Yugoslav League Championship
Football Association of Yugoslavia

References

External links
Yugoslavia Domestic Football Full Tables
Serbian Digital Library (Newspaper Politika: Archive (1904-1941)

1
Yugoslav Football Championship